The Works is an acoustic studio album by Australian singer-songwriter, Jon Stevens. It was released on the Liberation Blue label in November 2005 and features Stevens performing well known Noiseworks songs as well as tracks from his previous studio album Ain't No Life for the Faint Hearted and a cover of John Lennon's "Jealous Guy".

Tracks 1-11 are recorded at Eastern Bloc Studios, Melbourne. Tracks 12-14 are recorded at The Basement

In 2006, Stevens toured alongside Ian Moss with the “Six Strings & The Works”.

Track listing
 "Stand Alone" - 2:45
 "Love Vs. Money" - 3:53
 "Touch" - 4:20
 "Take Me Back" - 3:23
 "Rock With Me" - 4:01
 "Light My Fire" - 3:43
 "Get Low" - 4:17
 "Jealous Guy" - 3:45
 "Miles & Miles" -4:01
 "Freedom" - 4:24
 "R.I.P. (Millie)" - 4:08
 "In My Youth" - 4:00 	
 "Simple Man" - 3:31 	
 "Hot Chilli Woman" - 3:36

Credits
 Chris Bekker - acoustic bass
 Peter Gavin - piano, organ, Wurlitzer organ
 Simon Hosford - acoustic guitar
 Tony Kopa - rap vocals, percussion, background vocals

References

2005 albums
Liberation Records albums
Jon Stevens albums